Buddleja bhutanica is a species of flowering shrub endemic to Bhutan, where it grows in bush on mountain slopes at elevations around 1,700 m. The shrub was first described and named by Yamazaki in 1971.

Description
Buddleja bhutanica is a deciduous shrub 1.5–2 m in height, very similar to B. asiatica but distinguished by its perfoliate leaves. The branchlets are terete and glabrous, bearing opposite leaves, connate-perfoliate and narrowly oblong, 6–16 cm long by 3–8 cm wide, glabrous above and below, the margins serrate or entire. The white, very fragrant inflorescences comprise terminal panicles, 8–17 cm long by 3–8 cm wide, the corollas 4.5–5.5 mm long.

Cultivation
Buddleja bhutanica is not hardy in the UK; attempts at introduction, at the Chelsea Physic Garden and the Teignmouth Orangery, both failed.
Hardiness: USDA zone 9.

References

Li, P. T. & Leeuwenberg, A. J. M. (1996). Loganiaceae, in Wu, Z. & Raven, P. (eds) Flora of China, Vol. 15. Science Press, Beijing, and Missouri Botanical Garden Press, St. Louis, USA.  online at www.efloras.org

bhutanica
Endemic flora of Bhutan